This article shows all participating team squads at the 2013 Boys' Youth European Volleyball Championship, held in Serbia and Bosnia and Herzegovina from 12–21 April 2013.

The following is the Austria roster in the 2013 Boys' Youth European Volleyball Championship.

Head coach: Nina Sawatzki

The following is the Belgium roster in the 2013 Boys' Youth European Volleyball Championship.

Head coach: Steven Vanmedegael

The following is the Bosnia and Herzegovina roster in the 2013 Boys' Youth European Volleyball Championship.

The following is the Bulgaria roster in the 2013 Boys' Youth European Volleyball Championship.

The following is the Finland roster in the 2013 Boys' Youth European Volleyball Championship.

The following is the France roster in the 2013 Boys' Youth European Volleyball Championship.

The following is the Italy roster in the 2013 Boys' Youth European Volleyball Championship.

Head coach: Andrea Tomasini

The following is the Poland roster in the 2013 Boys' Youth European Volleyball Championship.

Head coach: Wiesław Czaja

The following is the Russia roster in the 2013 Boys' Youth European Volleyball Championship.

The following is the Serbia roster in the 2013 Boys' Youth European Volleyball Championship.

The following is the Slovenia roster in the 2013 Boys' Youth European Volleyball Championship.

The following is the Turkey roster in the 2013 Boys' Youth European Volleyball Championship.

References

External links
 Official website

European Boys' Youth Championship
Boys' Youth European Volleyball Championship